Margaret "Maggie" O'Neil is an American politician who is currently representing the city of Saco in the 15th district in the Maine House of Representatives.

Biography 
O'Neil grew up in Saco, Maine and attended Catherine McAuley High School in Portland. She graduated with a degree in Classics and History from the University of King's College in Halifax, Nova Scotia. O'Neil served in the Maine Conservation Corps and later worked as a park ranger at Ferry Beach State Park in Saco.

O'Neil was first elected to the Maine House of Representatives in November 2016, succeeding fellow Democrat Justin Chenette. At that time, she was the youngest woman serving in the Maine Legislature. She currently serves as the House Chair of the Joint Standing Committee on Agriculture, Conservation and Forestry and as a member of the Government Oversight Committee. O'Neil is currently a student at the University of Maine School of Law.

References 

Year of birth missing (living people)
Living people
Democratic Party members of the Maine House of Representatives
Women state legislators in Maine
People from Saco, Maine
21st-century American women politicians
21st-century American politicians
Dalhousie University alumni
University of King's College alumni
University of Maine School of Law alumni
Catherine McAuley High School alumni